The 2011 Wake Forest Demon Deacons football team represented Wake Forest University during the 2011 NCAA Division I FBS football season.  The team was coached by Jim Grobe, who was coaching his eleventh season at the school, and played its home games at BB&T Field.  Wake Forest competes in the Atlantic Coast Conference, as they have since the league's inception in 1953, and are in the Atlantic Division. They finished the season 6–7, 5–3 in ACC play to finish in a tie for second place in the Atlantic Division. They were invited to the Music City Bowl where they were defeated by Mississippi State 17–23.

Before the season

Recruiting
On National Signing Day, the Demon Deacons received letters of intent from 14 players.

Schedule

Roster

Coaching staff

Game summaries

Syracuse

2nd meeting. 1–0 all time. Last meeting 2006, 20–10 Demon Deacons in Winston-Salem.

NC State

105th meeting. 36–62–6 all time. Last meeting 2010, 38–3 Wolfpack in Raleigh.

Gardner-Webb

1st meeting.

Boston College

19th meeting. 6–10–2 all time. Last meeting 2010, 23–13 Eagles in Winston-Salem.

Florida State

30th meeting. 5–23–1 all time. Last meeting 2010, 31–0 Seminoles in Tallahassee.

Virginia Tech

36th meeting. 11–23–1 all time. Last meeting 2010, 52–21 Hokies in Blacksburg.

Duke

92nd meeting. 36–53–2 all time. Last meeting 2010, 54–48 Demon Deacons in Winston-Salem.

North Carolina

104th meeting. 34–67–2 all time. Last meeting 2007, 37–10 Demon Deacons in Winston-Salem.

Notre Dame

1st meeting.

Clemson

77th meeting. 17–58–1 all time. Last meeting 2010, 30–10 Tigers in Winston-Salem.

Maryland

60th meeting. 16–42–1 all time. Last meeting 2010, 62–14 Terrapins in College Park.

Vanderbilt

14th meeting. 6–7 all time. Last meeting 2010, 34–13 Demon Deacons in Nashville.

Mississippi State

1st meeting.

Statistics

Scores by quarter

Offense

Rushing

Passing

Receiving

Scoring

References

Wake Forest
Wake Forest Demon Deacons football seasons
Wake Forest Demon Deacons football